Aleksandar Ćosić (born 19 January 1922, date of death unknown) was a Yugoslav sprinter. He competed in the men's 4 × 400 metres relay at the 1948 Summer Olympics.

References

1922 births
Year of death missing
Athletes (track and field) at the 1948 Summer Olympics
Yugoslav male sprinters
Olympic athletes of Yugoslavia
Place of birth missing